{{Infobox film awards
| number           = 27
| award            = FAMAS Awards
| image            = 
| caption          = 
| date             = 1979
| site             = Philippines 
| host             =  
| producer         = 
| director         =  
| best_picture     =  '''Pagputi ng Uwak, Pagitim ng Tagak ~ VS Films| most_wins        =  Pagputi ng Uwak, Pagitim ng Tagak ~ VS Films (7 wins)
| most_nominations =  
| network          = 
| duration         = 
| ratings          = 
| last             = 26th
| next             = 28th
}}

The 27th Filipino Academy of Movie Arts and Sciences Awards Night was held in 1979 in the Philippines .  This is for the Outstanding Achievements of the different  films for the year 1978.Pagputi ng Uwak, Pagitim ng Tagak of VS Films was the most awarded film of the 27th FAMAS Awards winning the top prize for FAMAS Award for Best Picture, Best Director, Best Supporting Actress, Best Story, Best Cinematography, Best Musical Score and Best in Production Design. 

Awards

Major Awards
Winners are listed first and highlighted with boldface'''.

Special Awardee

References

External links
FAMAS Awards 

FAMAS Award
FAMAS
FAMAS